Cannock Chase Coalfield is a coalfield in Staffordshire, England, lying directly under Cannock Chase. It forms a rough triangle between Brereton, Essington and Pelsall.

The Cannock Chase Coalfield lies just to the north of the South Staffordshire Coalfield, from which it is separated by the Bentley Fault.

By 1890, the coalfield was producing 3 million tons of coal per year, and by 1933 this had risen to over 5 million tons.

The last working coal mine beneath Cannock Chase, Littleton Colliery, was situated in the village of Huntington, Staffordshire on the A34 and closed on 3 December 1993. Some of the coal from the mine was taken to power the nearby Rugeley Power Station.

Archives 
Historical records of Cannock Chase Colliery Company Limited, established in 1859, are held at the Cadbury Research Library (University of Birmingham).

References

External links
 Cannock Chase Mining Historical Society

Cannock Chase
Mining in Staffordshire
Coal mines in Staffordshire